Mary Pierce defeated Arantxa Sánchez Vicario in the final, 6–3, 6–2 to win the women's singles tennis title at the 1995 Australian Open.

Steffi Graf was the reigning champion, but did not participate due to an injury.

This tournament marked the first main-draw major appearance of future world No. 1 and major champion Martina Hingis; she lost in the second round to Kyōko Nagatsuka.

Seeds
The seeded players are listed below. Mary Pierce is the champion; others show the round in which they were eliminated.

Qualifying

Draw

Finals

Top half

Section 1

Section 2

Section 3

Section 4

Bottom half

Section 5

Section 6

Section 7

Section 8

External links
 1995 Australian Open – Women's draws and results at the International Tennis Federation

Women's singles
Australian Open (tennis) by year – Women's singles
1995 in Australian women's sport